WildBrain's current library includes:

 Decode Entertainment, including Freaky Stories, Waybuloo, and Angela Anaconda, excluding non-Canadian rights to Planet Sketch and Chop Socky Chooks, owned by Aardman Animations.
 Halifax Film Company’s library, including Lunar Jim.
 Cookie Jar Group and its predecessor CINAR, including programs such as Arthur (internationally only), and Caillou, it also includes the catalogs of:
 DIC Entertainment (excluding some co-productions owned by third party companies, and also excluding most DIC shows produced in France, owned by The Walt Disney Company via BVS Entertainment as part of the Créativité et Développement library)
 FilmFair including various Paddington Bear series and specials and other UK animated programs, such as The Wombles and The Adventures of Portland Bill.
 Coliseum Entertainment, including Johnny Test
 Echo Bridge Home Entertainment's family program catalog including productions from Alliance Atlantis and Salter Street Films.
 Epitome Pictures, including the catalog of its predecessor Playing With Time, Inc.
 Iconix Brand Group's entertainment assets including
 Peanuts Worldwide (41%), a joint venture with Sony Music Entertainment Japan and Charles M. Schulz Creative Associates, including all Peanuts television specials and three television series, excluding the 2014 animated series, owned by Warner Bros. Animation via Cartoon Network in North America and Dall'Angelo Pictures internationally, and five Peanuts theatrical films, owned by Paramount Global via Paramount Pictures and CBS Films and The Walt Disney Company via 20th Century Studios
 The Strawberry Shortcake brand, including television specials in the 1980s, the 2003 television series and a direct-to-video film.
 Nerd Corps Entertainment, including Rated A for Awesome and Slugterra, excluding co-productions such as Hot Wheels Battle Force 5 and Blaze and the Monster Machines.
 Ragdoll Productions’ joint venture, Ragdoll Worldwide, including Rosie and Jim, Brum, Teletubbies, Boohbah, and In the Night Garden..., excluding the rights to Pob's Programme and Playbox, owned by the main Ragdoll Productions studio.
 Studio B Productions, including Martha Speaks (internationally only) and Kid vs. Kat, but excluding the rights to co-productions such as My Little Pony: Friendship Is Magic, Super Supremes Nursery Rhymes and The Legend of Frosty the Snowman.
 The first incarnation of WildBrain, including Yo Gabba Gabba!, excluding co-productions with other companies.
 Global distribution rights to select Mattel Television programs including Bob the Builder, Fireman Sam, Little People and Polly Pocket.
 Global distribution rights to the Jay Ward Productions portfolio including The Adventures of Rocky and Bullwinkle and Friends, Hoppity Hooper, and George of the Jungle, excluding material produced by DreamWorks Animation and/or Classic Media, the 1999 film adaptation of Dudley Do-Right, the 2000 film adaptation of The Adventures of Rocky and Bullwinkle, and the 2014 film adaptation of Mr. Peabody and Sherman, which are owned by NBCUniversal via Universal Television and Universal Pictures respectively, and the 1997 film adaptation of George of the Jungle, owned by The Walt Disney Company via Walt Disney Pictures

See also 

 List of WildBrain programs

References 

WildBrain
WildBrain franchises